Kul-Kanas (Kül-Quñqaś) is a rural locality (a selo) in Karanovsky Selsoviet, Miyakinsky District, Bashkortostan, Russia. The population was 209 as of 2010. There are 2 streets.

Geography 
Kul-Kanas is located 35 km northeast of Kirgiz-Miyaki (the district's administrative centre) by road. Karan-Kunkas is the nearest rural locality.

References 

Rural localities in Miyakinsky District